James Robert Shillcock (born 1 August 1997) is an English rugby union fly-half for Bath in Premiership Rugby.

Shillcock began playing rugby for Warwick School at the age of 7. He made his debut for Worcester Warriors at the age of 17 against London Scottish in the RFU Championship semi-finals; becoming the youngest player to feature in the play-offs.

After making his debut at scrum-half he later played both full back and fly-half.  By the time he extended his contract with Worcester in December 2018 he was used predominantly at fly half.

On 5 October 2022 all Worcester players had their contacts terminated due to the liquidation of the company to which they were contracted.

Shortly after having his contract terminated at Worcester Shillcock was signed by Bath on a short-term deal along with former Worcester teammate Billy Searle.

References

1997 births
Living people
English rugby union players
Worcester Warriors players
Rugby union fly-halves
Rugby union players from Coventry
Bath Rugby players
Mitsubishi Sagamihara DynaBoars players